The 2018 Peruvian promotion play-offs or Cuadrangular de Ascenso 2018 was held in December 2018 with all games being played at Estadio Miguel Grau, Callao. The play-offs determined the third and fourth team to be promoted to the Torneo Descentralizado following that tournament's expansion. The teams place 2nd and 3rd in the 2018 Peruvian Segunda División and 2018 Copa Perú took part in the promotion play-offs. The top two placed team in the play-offs gained promotion in the 2019 Torneo Descentralizado and the bottom two qualified to the 2019 Peruvian Segunda División.

Background
The Peruvian Football Federation took control of the local domestic league from the Professional Football Sports Association, the tournament organizers, in 2018 and announced that the Peruvian first division tournament would be re-branded for 2019. With this re-branding, the tournament was expand from 16 to 18 teams.
At the beginning of the 2018 season, it was announced that the teams that finished 2nd and 3rd in the bottom two tiers of the Peruvian football league system would compete on the promotion play-offs at the end of the year to decide which two teams would receive the expansion slots.

Road to the play-offs

Segunda División

Liguilla

Third-place play-off

Carlos A. Mannucci and Cienciano advanced to the promotion play-offs.

Copa Perú

Final group stage

Alianza Universidad and Santos advanced to the promotion play-offs.

Promotion play-offs

See also
 2019 Torneo Descentralizado
 2018 Peruvian Segunda División
 2018 Copa Perú

References

External links
  
Peruvian Segunda División news at Peru.com 
Peruvian Segunda División statistics and news at Dechalaca.com 
 RSSSF

2018 in Peruvian football